Twins Oosterhout is baseball and softball club based in Oosterhout, the Netherlands. The Twins have played in the Honkbal Hoofdklasse since 2016. The team plays its home games at Slotbosse Toren Park.

Former Rakuten Golden Eagles pitcher Keiji Uezono played for the Twins in 2016. He went 4-1 with a 1.68 ERA in 59 innings pitched.

In 2021 the Twins began a exchange program with the Ibaraki Astro Planets of the Baseball Challenge League. Under the program, two Japanese players from the Astro Planets roster are playing with the Twins for the 2021 season. In the future the Twins will also be able to send players and/or coaches to the Astro Planets to participate in a full Baseball Challenge League season.

Current Roster

References

External links
Twins Official Website (Dutch)

Baseball teams in the Netherlands
Softball teams in the Netherlands